Hydnum umbilicatum, commonly known as the depressed hedgehog, is a species of tooth fungus in the family Hydnaceae. It was scientifically described in 1902 by American mycologist Charles Horton Peck. It is found in North America and in Europe. It is edible and good.

Hydnum umbilicatum has been found to be associated with pines. 

Can be confused with Hydnum repandum, also known as the Wood Hedgehog. These two can be distinguished by their teeth, the Wood Hedgehog being decurrent.

See also
 Hydnum repandum

References

External links
 

Edible fungi
Fungi described in 1902
Fungi of North America
umbilicatum